Ulcers in Executive Monkeys was a study into the effects of stress, published in 1958 in Scientific American by Joseph V. Brady.

Method of the experiment
In an early version of the study, Brady placed monkeys in 'restraining chairs' and conditioned them to press a lever. They were given electric shocks every 20 seconds unless they pressed the lever during the same time period. This study came to an abrupt halt when many of the monkeys died from perforated ulcers.

To test this Brady used a yoked control monkey. He placed an 'Executive Monkey' in the restraining chair, which could press the lever to prevent the electric shock. The yoked monkey had no control over the lever, leaving only the 'Executive' with the psychological stress of pushing the lever.

Results
After 23 days of a continuous 6 hours on, 6 hours off schedule of electric shocks, the executive monkey died. Brady then tried various schedules, but no monkeys died from this. He then returned to the original 6 on, 6 off, and tested the stomachs of the Executives and found that their stomach acidity was greatest during the rest period.

The greatest danger occurred when the sympathetic arousal stopped and the stomach was flooded with digestive hormones. This was a parasympathetic rebound associated with the Hypothalamic-pituitary-adrenal axis, which led to the development of ulcers in the Executive monkeys.

In all the variations of the experiment, no yoked control monkey ever developed an ulcer. This suggests that the ulcers were a symptom of the excessive stress induced by having control. Hans Selye's General Adaptation Syndrome proposes a similar effect in the Exhaustion phase.

See also
 Animal testing on non-human primates

Notes

Psychology experiments
Scientific American articles